John Conington (10 August 1825 – 23 October 1869) was an English classical scholar. In 1866 he published his best-known work, the translation of the Aeneid of Virgil into the octosyllabic metre of Walter Scott. He was Corpus Professor of Latin at the University of Oxford from 1854 till his death.

Life
He was born at Boston in Lincolnshire, and is said to have learned the alphabet at fourteen months, and to have been reading well at three and a half. He was educated at Beverley Grammar School, at Rugby School and at Oxford, where, after matriculating at University College, he came into residence at Magdalen, where he had been nominated to a demyship. He was Ireland and Hertford scholar in 1844; in March 1846 he was elected to a scholarship at University College, and in December of the same year he obtained a first class in classics; in February 1848 he became a fellow of University. He also obtained the Chancellor's prizes for Latin verse (1847), English essay (1848) and Latin essay (1849). He successfully applied for the Eldon Law Scholarship in 1849, and went to Lincoln's Inn; but after six months he resigned the scholarship and returned to Oxford.

During his brief residence in London he began writing for the Morning Chronicle, and continued to do so after leaving. He showed no special aptitude for journalism, but a series of articles on university reform (1849–1850) was the first public expression of his views on a subject that always interested him. In 1854 his appointment, as first occupant, to the chair of Latin literature, founded by Corpus Christi College, Oxford, gave him a congenial position.
 
Known to be sympathetic to Radical political causes such as Chartism, Conington also loved intense scholarly conversation, often inviting favoured undergraduates to accompany him on his regular 2pm walks.  One such was the future Idealist philosopher, T.H. Green. Henry Nettleship described the selection procedure:
'First came the invitation to breakfast; then if the undergraduate pleased him, an invitation to walk: then more breakfasts and more walks: then, if the young man had survived this ordeal … perhaps an invitation to join a reading party in the Long [Vacation].  The final stage of intimacy was the fixing of a particular day in the week to walk with a particular man.  To this last both Green and I at length attained, Green’s day being Monday and mine Wednesday.' 
J.A. Symonds was another student friend of Conington's and he and Green accompanied Conington on several of his summer reading parties during the Long Vacation. 
From this time he confined himself with characteristic conscientiousness almost exclusively to Latin literature. The only important exception was the translation of the last twelve books of the Iliad in the Spenserian stanza in completion of the work of P.S. Worsley, and this was undertaken in fulfilment of a promise made to his dying friend.

Conington died at Boston.

Works
Conington's edition of Persius, with commentary and a prose translation was published posthumously in 1872. In the same year appeared his Miscellaneous Writings, edited by John Addington Symonds, with a memoir by Henry John Stephen Smith (see also Hugh Andrew Johnstone Munro in Journal of Philology, ii., 1869).

In 1852 Conington began, in conjunction with Goldwin Smith, a complete edition of Virgil with a commentary, of which the first volume appeared in 1858, the second in 1864, and the third soon after his death. Goldwin Smith was compelled to withdraw from the work at an early stage, and in the last volume his place was taken by Henry Nettleship.

Conington's other editions are:

Aeschylus, Agamemmon (1848), Choëphori (1857); 
 English verse translations of Horace, Odes and Carmen Saeculare (1863), Satires, Epistles and Ars Poëtica (1869).

See also 
 English translations of Homer: John Conington

References

External links 

 
 
 

1825 births
1869 deaths
People from Boston, Lincolnshire
English classical scholars
People educated at Rugby School
Alumni of University College, Oxford
Alumni of Magdalen College, Oxford
People educated at Beverley Grammar School
Classical scholars of the University of Oxford
Corpus Christi Professors of Latin
Scholars of ancient Greek literature
Scholars of Latin literature
Latin–English translators
Greek–English translators
19th-century translators
English male writers
19th-century British male writers
Presidents of the Oxford Union
Translators of Homer